Thewet Naruemit Bridge is a historic bridge over canal Khlong Phadung Krung Kasem in Bangkok, Thailand. Its name is also the name of the surrounding area known as Thewet. The bridge straddles between four sub-districts of two administrative districts of Bangkok, namely Wat Sam Phraya and Bang Khun Phrom Subdistricts, Phra Nakhon District with Wachiraphayaban and Dusit Subdistricts, Dusit District.

History 
King Chulalongkorn (Rama V) ordered the Department of Public Works to construct the bridge. The King named it "Thewet Naruemit Bridge". "Thewet" means "great deity" and refers to The Bridge Built by Hindu's Lord Shiva. When completed King Chulalongkorn gave the opening ceremony on June 30, 1899. It is the first bridge to cross Khlong Phadung Krung Kasem during his reign.

The bridge was restored in 1975. It was restored again along with Tha Chang Pier by the Ministry of Transport scheduled for completion May 2021.

Surroundings 
Thewet Market is one of Bangkok's big and busy markets around the bridge. It is very famous, especially as a source of ornamental plants.   The market is also famous for selling fish released for charity. In the past, it used to be the largest market in the suburbs. While the largest wholesale vegetable market such as Talat Thai and Si Mum Mueang Market has not yet been established, there are some vendors sailing from Suphan Buri to trade here.

Thewet is the terminal of many bus lines.

Thewet Pier (N15) is a station for Chao Phraya Express Boat that runs from Asiatique: The Riverfront to Nonthaburi province north of Bangkok.

References

1899 establishments in Siam
Bridges in Bangkok
Phra Nakhon district
Dusit district
Registered ancient monuments in Bangkok
Neighbourhoods of Bangkok